Yizhuang Area is an area and a town of Daxing District, in the southeast suburbs of Beijing, located just outside the 5th Ring Road. Beijing Economic-Technological Development Area (BDA), the biggest economic and technical area is located here. There are a lot of high-tech research centers and joint ventures. As of 2020, It had a census population of 108,255.

History

Administrative divisions 
As of the time in writing, Yizhuang Area comprises 26 subdivisions, consisting of 19 residential communities, 5 villages and 2 industrial areas:

See also
List of township-level divisions of Beijing

References

Towns in Beijing
Daxing District
Areas of Beijing